The Liberal Archive (Dutch: Liberaal Archief), located in Ghent, is the central archive of the Belgian liberal organizations, such as the liberal party (Flemish Liberals and Democrats and Reformist Movement), the Willemsfonds, the Liberaal Vlaams Verbond and the liberal young guards/Pvv-Jongeren.

The Liberal Archive was founded in Ghent in 1982 and was recognised by the Flemish Community by a decree on 9 July 2002.

See also
 Contributions to liberal theory
 Liberalism
 Liberalism in Belgium
 Liberalism worldwide
 National and Provincial State Archives

Sources
 Erfgoeddag in het Liberaal Archief 
 ODIS intermediaire structuren in Vlaanderen 19e-20e eeuw

External links

  

Archives in Belgium
Belgian culture
Liberal organizations